Dariusz Goździak (born 6 December 1962) is a Polish former modern pentathlete. He competed at the 1992 Summer Olympics winning a gold medal in the team event.

References

1962 births
Living people
Polish male modern pentathletes
Olympic modern pentathletes of Poland
Modern pentathletes at the 1992 Summer Olympics
Olympic gold medalists for Poland
Olympic medalists in modern pentathlon
Recipients of the Order of Polonia Restituta
People from Sulęcin
Sportspeople from Lubusz Voivodeship
Medalists at the 1992 Summer Olympics